Ujan-e Gharbi Rural District is in the Central District of Bostanabad County, East Azerbaijan province, Iran. At the census of 2006, its population was 10,458 in 1,940 households; there were 9,621 inhabitants in 2,421 households at the following census of 2011; and in the most recent census of 2016, the population of the rural district was 8,865 in 2,491 households. The largest of its 26 villages was Charzeh Khun, with 1,679 people.

References 

Bostanabad County

Rural Districts of East Azerbaijan Province

Populated places in East Azerbaijan Province

Populated places in Bostanabad County